Robert Montgomery (1807–1855) was an English poet and minister, the natural son of Robert Gomery (1778-1853), an actor and clown, and Elizabeth Meadows Boyce, a schoolteacher. He was born in Bath, Somerset, and educated at a private school in the city. Later, he founded an unsuccessful weekly paper in that city. In 1828 he published The Omni-presence of the Deity, which hit popular religious sentiment so exactly that it ran through eight editions in as many months. In 1830 he followed it with The Puffiad (a satire), and Satan, or Intellect without God. An exhaustive review in Blackwood's by John Wilson, followed in the thirty-first number by a burlesque of Satan, and two articles in the first volume of Fraser, ridiculed Montgomery's pretensions and the excesses of his admirers. But his name was immortalized by Macaulay's famous onslaught in the Edinburgh Review for April 1830, "an annihilating so Jove-like that the victim automatically commands the spectator's rueful sympathy." This review did not, however, diminish the sale of his poems; The Omnipresence of the Deity reached its 28th edition in 1858. In 1830 Montgomery entered Lincoln College, Oxford, graduating B.A. in 1833 and M.A. in 1838. Taking holy orders in 1835 he obtained a curacy at Whittington, Shropshire, which he exchanged in 1836 for the charge of the church of St. Jude, Glasgow. In 1843 he removed to the parish of St. Pancras, London, when he was minister of Percy Chapel.

Family
On 7 October 1843, at St George's Hanover Square, London, Montgomery married Rachel Catherine Andrews MacKenzie (1814-82), the daughter of Alexander Douglas McKenzie (died 1842) of Bursledon, Hampshire, and had a daughter:
 Jessie Anne Douglas Montgomery (1851-1918)

His brother-in-law was Rev Frederic Charles Cook (1804-1889).

Montgomery died at Brighton on 3 December 1855.

List of works
The Omni-presence of the Deity, (1828)
The Puffiad, (1830)
Satan, or Intellect without God, (1830)
Oxford, (1831)
The Messiah, (1832)
Woman, the Angel of Life, (1833)
God and Man: being outlines of religious and moral truth, according to Scripture and the church, (1850)

References

External links
 
 
 

1807 births
1855 deaths
Alumni of Lincoln College, Oxford
English male poets
19th-century English Anglican priests
19th-century English poets
19th-century English male writers
People from Bath, Somerset